The LendingTree Bowl is a postseason NCAA-sanctioned Division I FBS college football bowl game that has been played annually in Mobile, Alabama since 1999. In 2021, the game was moved from Ladd-Peebles Stadium to Hancock Whitney Stadium, on the campus of the University of South Alabama. The game currently matches teams from the Sun Belt Conference and the Mid-American Conference. Originally known as the Mobile Alabama Bowl during its first two playings, it has undergone many name changes.

History
The game was known as the Mobile Alabama Bowl for its first two playings, in 1999 and 2000. GMAC (now Ally Financial) had become the title sponsor for the 2000 playing, and the game was renamed as the GMAC Bowl for the 2001 though January 2010 playings. It was then the GoDaddy.com Bowl for the January 2011 to January 2013 playings when GoDaddy took over sponsorship. In May 2013, it was announced that the ".com" would be dropped from the bowl's name, rebranding it as the GoDaddy Bowl for the January 2014 through December 2015 editions. Dollar General took over sponsorship on August 17, 2016, with the 2016 through 2018 playings branded as the Dollar General Bowl. It was announced on May 29, 2019, that Dollar General would no longer sponsor the bowl. It was temporarily called by its original name, the Mobile Alabama Bowl, until new sponsorship by LendingTree was announced on November 15, 2019, making it the LendingTree Bowl.

When the bowl first began, it was played as one of the first games of the bowl season in December. The 2006 season saw the game moved to January, and it served as one of the last bowls played before the national championship game of either the Bowl Championship Series or the College Football Playoff. For the 2015 season, the bowl was moved back to December, where it remained for every subsequent playing except for the 2019 season.

Conference tie-ins
From 1999 to 2009, the bowl pitted a Conference USA (C-USA) team against a team from the Mid-American Conference (MAC), except for the first two playings, when the Western Athletic Conference (WAC) could receive the bid if one of its easternmost teams qualified as bowl eligible.

For the January 2010 edition, the Atlantic Coast Conference (ACC) was to participate in the bowl as its ninth bowl tie-in. The ACC failed to have sufficient bowl-eligible teams to fill the slot, and the bowl chose Sun Belt Conference champion Troy as a replacement. A MAC vs. Sun Belt matchup was then featured for a total of 11 consecutive bowls, through the January 2020 edition. That streak was broken when the December 2020 edition invited teams from C-USA and the Sun Belt.

Notable games
The 2001 game between the Marshall Thundering Herd and East Carolina Pirates set the record as the highest-scoring bowl game of all time, and Marshall achieved what was then the greatest scoring comeback in bowl history. In this contest, Marshall battled back from a 38–8 deficit to win 64–61 in double overtime. Thundering Herd quarterback Byron Leftwich threw for 576 yards in the game. The 2008 game had the largest margin of victory in bowl history, with Tulsa defeating Bowling Green, 63–7.

Game results

Source:

MVPs

Most appearances
Updated through the December 2022 edition (24 games, 48 total appearances).

Teams with multiple appearances

Teams with a single appearance
Won (7): Appalachian State, Central Michigan, Georgia Southern, Georgia State, Liberty, Louisiana, Northern Illinois

Lost (8): Buffalo, Eastern Michigan, Kent State, Memphis, Middle Tennessee State, Rice, UTEP, Western Kentucky

Appearances by conference
Updated through the December 2022 edition (24 games, 48 total appearances).

 Games marked with an asterisk (*) were played in January of the following calendar year.
 The WAC no longer sponsors FBS football.
 Independent appearances: Liberty (2021)

Game records

Source:

 While listed in the record book as the bowl's longest touchdown pass, contemporary box scores indicate that this play did not result in a touchdown.

Media coverage

The bowl has been televised on ESPN or ESPN2 since its inception.

References

External links

 
College football bowls
Sports in Mobile, Alabama
Recurring sporting events established in 1999
Events in Mobile, Alabama